The Journal of Law and Economics is an academic journal published by the University of Chicago Press. It publishes articles on the economic analysis of regulation and the behavior of regulated firms, the political economy of legislation and legislative processes, law and finance, corporate finance and governance, and industrial organization. The journal is sponsored by the University of Chicago Law School.

The journal was founded by Aaron Director at the University of Chicago in 1958, and Ronald Coase joined him later as the co-editor. The journal played an important role in the formation of the field Law and Economics.

References

External links 
 

Law and economics journals
Economics journals
University of Chicago Press academic journals
Quarterly journals
English-language journals
Publications established in 1958